is a Japanese voice actress from Kanagawa Prefecture, Japan.

Biography

Filmography

Anime
2014
Celestial Method as Resident
Magic Kaito 1412
Selector Infected Wixoss as girl
Your Lie in April as parent; high school girl

2015
Chivalry of a Failed Knight as girl
Bikini Warriors as goddess
Durarara!!×2 Shō as reporter
Isuca as girl

2016
Active Raid as operator B
Digimon Universe: App Monsters as girl; elementary schoolgirl
Rilu Rilu Fairilu ~Yōsei no Door~ as Haruto Kusunoki; Jasmine; Lilas Hanamura; Omatsu; Tora; Urara
Schwarzesmarken as Rosalinde Buch; Paul Meyer
WWW.Wagnaria!! as male student B
Yu-Gi-Oh! Arc-V

2017
Dream Festival! R as fan
Elegant Yokai Apartment Life as Gyaru A; Yon-chan; female student
Food Wars! Shokugeki no Soma: The Third Plate as woman A
Fuuka as female staff member
Gamers! as student B; female student B; waitress; clerk
Kino's Journey —the Beautiful World— the Animated Series as child A
MARGINAL#4 KISS kara Sōzōru Big Bang as girl; AD; controller
Minami Kamakura High School Girls Cycling Club as member A
My Girlfriend Is Shobitch as female student
Re:Creators as child
Rewrite as child; woman
Rilu Rilu Fairilu ~Mahō no Kagami~ as Haruto Kusunoki
Sakura Quest as female announcer; old woman
Time Bokan 24 as town girl 2
The Idolmaster SideM as boy; Dance Trainer
Urara Meirocho as clerk

2018
Aguu: Tensai Ningyou as dancer lady C
Dakaichi as woman
Comic Girls as clerk; grandmother
Dame×Prince Anime Caravan as citizen B
Golden Kamuy as Ainu girls
Idolish7 as Strawberries
Rokuhōdō Yotsuiro Biyori as customer; clerk
Seven Senses of the Reunion as adventurer

2019
Fairy Gone as old woman
Fruits Basket as student
Kandagawa Jet Girls as interviewer
Teasing Master Takagi-san as girl B
The Case Files of Lord El-Melloi II as magician
Wasteful Days of High School Girls as Game Center woman 1; elementary schooler

2020
Darwin's Game as nursing teacher
Food Wars! Shokugeki no Soma: The Fifth Plate as cook A
Genie Family 2020 as housewife
If My Favorite Pop Idol Made It to the Budokan, I Would Die as old lady
Interspecies Reviewers as Tamatehime
Mewkledreamy as scholar

2021
Blue Reflection Ray as granny
Higehiro as older brother
Mieruko-chan as Arai
That Time I Got Reincarnated as a Slime Season 2 as elf D

2022
Akebi's Sailor Uniform as TV audio
Love After World Domination as boy B; announcer; boy

Theatrical anime
2015
Ongaku Shōjo as cat

Web anime
2021
Gundam Breaker Battlogue as event participant

Video games
2013
AiColle ~with you~ as Ai Yumeno; Feni
Code of Joker

2014
Anmin Hizamakura ~Shūshin 5-bu Mae no Iyashi Time~ Kaede Shirasaki Ver. as Kaede Shirasaki
Heroes Placement as Kanen Sonode; Suzu Koie; Manchiru Zenibaku; Uto Criterium; Laura Samezu; Tenma Mizushima; Nanari Nirasaki; Mira Uozu; Ara Oyada
Uchi no Hime-sama ga Ichiban Kawaii as Millie Spica
Yuki Yuna is a Hero

2015
Armed Girls
Genjū Hime as Uru
Granblue Fantasy as You; Burning Indigo
Langrisser Re:Incarnation Tensei
Princess Connect!
Quiz RPG: The World of Mystic Wiz as Sorissa Mima; Milneemo
Thousand Memories as Molina, Pistol of the Dark; Annetta, Piercing Princess of Flame; Melville, Guard Captain of the Artillery Arm; Pipi, Soul Swordsman

2016
Black Night Strikers as Jeanne d'Arc; Bishop Cauchon
Formation Girls as Jamie Lacey; Mariane Carly
Icchibanketsu -Online- as Yaoya Oshichi
Odin Sphere Leifthrasir as Mori
Sengoku Kitan Muramasa -Miyabi- as Tachibana Ginchiyo

2017
Clash of Panzer as Clark Meyer
Destiny Child as Ishtar
Fight League as Shinobu Nekoma (Shinobu Catari)

2018
Dungeon Fighter Online as Falmel; Moplin
Gintama Rumble as Hyakka; tradeswoman
Monster Strike as Apocalypse; Apricot
Secret of Mana as Pamela
Tenka Hyakken -Zan- as Furiwakegami Hiromitsu

2020
Disney Twisted-Wonderland as Trey Clover (young)
KiraKira Monstars as Arisa

2021
Isekai ni Tobasaretara Papa ni Nattandaga ~Seirei Kishidan Monogatari~ as Suzaku
JACKJEANNE
Mega Man X DiVE as Hunter R
Monster Hunter Rise as Hunter
Touhou Danmaku Kagura as Minoriko Aki
World of Demons - Hyakki Madō as Ibaraki-dōji

2022
Uma Musume Pretty Derby as Purple Scrunchie Horse Girl

Drama CD
2011
Otome Yōkai Zakuro

2013
Minarai Megami Purupurun Sharumu

2014
Karneval: Futari no Yogi
Miss Monochrome -Motto Challenge- Colorful God

2015
Gomidame PEACE 5th Homes Stay

Music CD
Dragon Poker Original Soundtrack
Dreaming Now

Digital Comic
Haru to Koi to Kimi no Koto (2020) as Hiroka Mishima

Overseas Dubbing

Movie
Casablanca as Mrs. Reichtag (N.E.M. version)
Dark Places as young Libby Day (Sterling Jerins)
Fire City: End of Days as Sara
Leaves of Grass as Colleen (Melanie Lynskey)
Operasjon Arktis as Julia (Kaisa Gurine Antonsen)
Plastic as Fionna (Amelle Berrabah)
The Conjuring: The Devil Made Me Do It as David Glatzel (Julian Hilliard)
The Curse of La Llorona as Samantha Garcia (Jaynee-Lynne Kinchen)

Live Action TV
Crusoe as Epi
Lost in Space as Judy Robinson
Two Weeks as Jang Young-ja

Animation
Unstable Fables: Tortoise vs. Hare as Crystal Tortoise

Video Games
Life is Strange (2015) as Brooke Scott
The Last of Us Part II (2020)

Narration
NewGin Commercial Soreyuke Yasei no Ōkoku
Panasonic Nanoi Humidified Air Purifier F-VXK90
Sports Life Technology Lab
Takara Tomy Disney & Disney/Pixar Characters Dekita! ga Ippai Dream Pad
Tokyo Shoe Distribution Center

Voiceover

Commercials
Shimajiman 2016
Dengeki Bunko Magazine
Nintendo 3DS My Melody: Negai ga Kanau Fushigi na Hako

Radio
Rainbow Town FM Fun×Fun Tuesday ~Queen de Night~ (guest)

Stage
Ayashikai Jitsu (March 28-April 2, 2018, Mottoi Fudō, Mitsuzōin)
Don Giovanni as Zellina
The World of Kenji Miyazawa as Calico Cat
Remax Rookie Performance

Other
Good Neighbors Japan Parent-Child Challenge International Understanding! Little Child Drawing Contest DVD as Daiki

Discography

Character Songs

References

External links

 

Living people
Japanese video game actresses
Japanese voice actresses
Voice actresses from Kanagawa Prefecture
21st-century Japanese actresses
Year of birth missing (living people)